Joseph Hiriart (1888–1946) was a French architect.

Early life
Joseph Hiriart was born in 1888. He graduated from the École des Beaux-Arts in 1922.

Career
Hiriart specialized in Art Deco architecture.  He designed the Villa Leïhorra in Ciboure and the Blue Villa in Barcelonnette, both of which are official historical monuments. He also designed the Musee de la mer in Biarritz.

Personal life
Hiriart resided in Saint-Paul-sur-Ubaye. His brother-in-law, Joseph Signoret, was a director of the El Palacio de Hierro in Mexico City, Mexico.

Death
Hiriart died in 1946.

References

1888 births
1946 deaths
École des Beaux-Arts alumni
20th-century French architects
Art Deco architects